The men's sprint was one of the three cycling events, all track cycling, now regarded as "Olympic" on the Cycling at the 1900 Summer Olympics programme. It was held on 11 September and 13 September. The sprint, a 2000-metre race with 1000-metre heats, was conducted in four rounds. 69 of the 72 cyclists competed in the sprint, including cyclists from all six competing nations. The event was won by Albert Taillandier of France (the nation's second consecutive victory in the men's sprint), with his countryman Fernand Sanz in second place. John Henry Lake of the United States won the nation's first cycling medal with his bronze.

Background

This was the second appearance of the event, which has been held at every Summer Olympics except 1904 and 1912. None of the cyclists from 1896 returned. Two of the three top sprinters in 1900 were French and competed: Ferdinand Vasserot and Albert Taillandier. (The third, Alphonse Didier-Nauts of Belgium, did not compete). An American, John Henry Lake, however, had finished second in the world championships to Didier-Nauts and was the most significant non-French competitor in the field.

Belgium, Bohemia, Italy, and the United States each made their debut in the men's sprint. France and Germany made their second appearance, having previously competed in 1896.

Competition format

Unlike modern sprint events (which use a flying 200 metre time trial to cut down and seed the field, followed by one-on-one matches), the 1900 sprint used very large initial heats of up to eight cyclists each before smaller quarterfinals, semifinals, and final with three cyclists in each race. For the first round, the top three cyclists in each heat advanced; in the quarterfinals and semifinals, only the fastest man moved on. The distance for each race was 1 kilometre.

Records

The records for the sprint are 200 metre flying time trial records, kept for the qualifying round in later Games as well as for the finish of races.

* World records were not tracked by the UCI until 1954.

Lloyd Hildebrand set the initial record of 15.4 seconds in the first heat. Adolphe Cayron improved on that in the second heat, to 14.2 seconds. John Henry Lake dropped the record to 14.0 seconds in heat 6. Antonio Restelli finished the first round with a 13.6 second time in the ninth heat. Lake responded with 13.2 seconds in the first quarterfinal, only to see Restelli go 13.0 seconds in the fourth. Albert Taillandier dropped below that to 12.6 seconds in the next quarterfinal, a time that held through the rest of the 1900 Games.

Schedule

Results

Round 1

The first round was held on 11 September. It began at 9 a.m. The top three cyclists in each of the 9 heats advanced to the quarterfinals.

Heat 1

Stratta was a wheel behind Hildebrand, with Vasserot very close after that.

Heat 2

Coindre was a wheel behind Cayron; Daumain was not close.

Heat 3

Sanz was a half-length behind Gottron.

Heat 4

Heat 5

Davis was a length behind Maisonnave.

Heat 6

Heat 7

Dohis was a wheel behind Taillandier, with Germain a close third.

Heat 8

Heat 9

Wick and Hubault fell and did not finish.

Quarterfinals

The quarterfinals were also held on the first day of competition, 11 September. They began at 2 p.m. Only the winning cyclist of each of the 9 quarterfinals advanced to the semifinals.

Quarterfinal 1

Stratta was three lengths behind Lake.

Quarterfinal 2

Bullier was two lengths behind Sanz.

Quarterfinal 3

Duill was a wheel behind Coindre.

Quarterfinal 4

Hildebrand was a wheel behind Restelli.

Quarterfinal 5

Vincent was two lengths behind Taillandier.

Quarterfinal 6

In a very close race, Brusoni was a quarter-wheel behind Mallet.

Quarterfinal 7

Ponscarme was three lengths behind Maisonnave.

Quarterfinal 8

Dohis was a half length behind Vasserot.

Quarterfinal 9

Semifinals

The semifinals were conducted on 13 September. The top cyclist in each of the three semifinals advanced to the final, guaranteeing himself a medal.

Semifinal 1

Lake had defeated Vasserot previously in 1900, at the world championships where the two had placed second and third to Léon Didier-Nauts. Lake won again in this match, with Vasserot a short length behind.

Semifinal 2

Restelli was a half wheel behind Sanz.

Semifinal 3

Final

The final was held on the same day as the semifinals, 13 September.

Results summary

References

 International Olympic Committee medal winners database
 De Wael, Herman. Herman's Full Olympians: "Cycling - track 1900". Accessed 19 March 2006.
 

Men's sprint
Cycling at the Summer Olympics – Men's sprint